Juan Antonio Orrego-Salas (January 18, 1919 – November 24, 2019) was a Chilean composer, musicologist, music critic, and academic.

Life and career
Born Juan Antonio Orrego-Salas in Santiago on January 18, 1919, Orrego-Salas studied at the Conservatorio Nacional de Música (Chile), the music school of the University of Chile, in his native city where he was a pupil of Pedro Humberto Allende (composition) and Domingo Santa Cruz Wilson (composition). He also earned of Bachelor of Arts in architecture in addition to earning his diploma in music composition from the University of Chile. 

After completing his degrees, Orrego-Salas joined the faculty of Conservatorio Nacional de Música where he was a lecturer in music history, and he simultaneously joined the faculty of the Pontifical Catholic University of Chile where he founded the university choir in 1938. Grants from the Rockefeller Foundation and a Guggenheim Fellowship enabled him to pursue further studies in the United States from 1944 through 1946. During this period he studied music composition with Aaron Copland and Randall Thompson and musicology with Paul Henry Lang and George Herzog. 

In 1947 Orrego-Salas was appointed professor of music composition at the University of Chile; and was awarded the title Profesor Extraordinario at that institution in 1953. He concurrently served as editor of the Revista musical chilena, a position he began in 1949, and began working as a  music critic for El Mercurio in 1950. A second Guggenheim Fellowship awarded in 1954 brought Orrego-Salas back to the United States in 1954-1956. After returning to Chile he served concurrently as director of El Instituto de Extensión Musical at the Conservatorio Nacional de Música and as dean of the music school at the Pontifical Catholic University of Chile. His students in Chile included composer Sylvia Soublette. 

In 1961, Orrego-Salas permanently relocated to the United States to work at  Indiana University Bloomington, where he co-founded the Latin American Music Center (LAMC). One of his students at IU's Jacobs School of Music was composer Ricardo Lorenz who succeeded him as director of the LAMC. In 1992, he was the inaugural winner of Chile's National Prize for Musical Arts.

He died in Bloomington, Indiana, on November 24, 2019.

References

External links
   (accessed 1 October 2013).
 La Ciudad Celeste, conducted by Carmen-Helena Téllez
 A conversation with Juan Orrego-Salas, recorded March 1, 2014
 Interview with Juan Orrego-Salas, August 17, 1991
 A Latin American Composer in the United States, 2004

1919 births
2019 deaths
Chilean composers
Chilean male composers
Chilean musicologists
20th-century classical composers
People from Santiago
Jacobs School of Music faculty
Academic staff of the Pontifical Catholic University of Chile
University of Chile alumni
Academic staff of the University of Chile
Male classical composers
Chilean emigrants to the United States
20th-century male musicians
Chilean centenarians
Men centenarians